Mission: Space (stylized as Mission: SPACE) is a space exploration-themed pavilion and attached centrifugal motion simulator attraction located in the World Discovery section of Epcot at Walt Disney World in Bay Lake, Florida. The attraction simulates what an astronaut might experience aboard a spacecraft on a mission to Mars, from the higher g-force of liftoff, to the speculative hypersleep. The pavilion also includes the Mission Space: Cargo Bay gift shop, the Advanced Training Lab interactive play area and Space 220 Restaurant.

History
The attraction opened to the public in a "soft opening" mode in June 2003, and celebrated its grand opening on October 9 with a ceremony attended by Disney CEO Michael Eisner, HP CEO Carly Fiorina and NASA Administrator Sean O'Keefe, as well as several NASA astronauts from its many phases of human space exploration (Mercury, Gemini, Apollo, the Space Shuttle program and two crew members aboard the International Space Station). The attraction was built on the former site of Horizons, a dark ride that offered optimistic visions of what life might be like in the future. Horizons closed permanently in 1999 after a few years of sporadic operation; construction began on Mission: Space shortly thereafter. Industry estimates put the cost of developing the new attraction at US$100 million. The pavilion, like others at Epcot, used to feature a VIP lounge for HP employees called The Red Planet Room.

Mission: Space was sponsored by Compaq, which began working with Disney Imagineers on the design in April 2000. Hewlett-Packard assumed the sponsorship upon its merger with Compaq in 2002. The simulator hardware used in Mission: Space was designed and built by Environmental Tectonics Corporation of Pennsylvania with a nearly $30 million contract awarded in February 2000. Environmental Tectonics sued Disney in 2003 seeking over $15 million US alleging failure to pay the full amount of the contract and sharing proprietary design details with competitors. The companies settled in January 2009. HP later declined to renew its sponsorship, and the company's branding was removed in 2015.

The attraction was completely closed for a refurbishment on June 5, 2017. During the D23 Expo 2017, it was confirmed that the Green Mission would be given a new video simulating a flight around the Earth, and the Orange Mission would keep the Mars mission, but with updated graphics. The attraction reopened on August 13, 2017 with the Earth Mission (or Green Mission), where the centrifuge does not spin as much, thus eliminating the forces of lateral acceleration for riders who choose the more tame experience. The cabs themselves still pitch and pivot, providing some motion. The attraction's opening day experience was renamed the Mars Mission (or Orange Mission).

Ride experience

Mission: Space is meant to simulate astronaut training for the first crewed mission to Mars aboard the fictional X-2 Deep Space Shuttle in 2036, right after the seventy-fifth anniversary of Yuri Gagarin becoming the first human to enter space. The attraction queue contains several items and commemorative plaques from past, present, and fictional future space missions. Among the items on display are props from the 2000 film Mission to Mars, including the rotating "gravity wheel" from the predecessor X-1 spacecraft, a model of which hangs from the ceiling, and a replica of a NASA moon rover from the Apollo program.

Pre-show
Riders enter the fictional International Space Training Center (ISTC), where they are arranged into crews of four before watching an introductory video by the ISTC's Capsule communicator (or Capcom). Actor Gary Sinise, who starred in the space film Mission to Mars, portrayed Capcom from the attraction's opening day until 2017, after which, actress Gina Torres, replaced him in the role.

Before boarding, each rider is assigned an on-board role (navigator, pilot, commander, or engineer) and given two tasks to perform during the mission, by pressing a specific button when prompted. The spacecraft's on-board self-automated pilot will perform each task if the rider does not respond to their prompt from Mission Control or if there is no one to perform the task. Also featured are various labeled buttons and switches which the rider may interact with but have no function.

Attraction
For both missions, riders board the futuristic X-2 vehicle, a three-stage rocket which is said to use several technologies in development today, including aerospike engines, solid hydrogen fuel, an aerobrake, and carbon nanotubes. Mission: Space is divided in two missions:

The Mars Mission (intense or Orange Mission) includes a liftoff from the ISTC, a slingshot around the moon for a gravity-assisted boost, followed by a brief period of simulated hypersleep (to pass the lengthy time required to reach Mars), and a descent for landing on the Martian surface, where riders manually control the vehicle with a joystick.
The Earth Mission (less intense or Green Mission) includes a liftoff from the ISTC, an orbiting tour of the Earth, and a descent back to the ISTC that involves riders having to manually navigate through a thunderstorm over the landing runway using their joystick.

Upon conclusion of the training exercise, guests exit through the Advanced Training Lab interactive play area, and Mission Space: Cargo Bay gift shop.

Mechanics
The attraction is a multiple-arm centrifuge that achieves the illusion of acceleration by spinning and tilting sealed capsules during the four-minute "mission". Fans blow air gently at riders to help avoid motion sickness, and a magnified display in front of each rider simulates a window to space with high-resolution computer-generated imagery. Mission: Space comprises four separate centrifuges, each with 10 capsules holding four riders. The attraction exposes riders to forces up to 2.5G, more than twice the force of gravity at the Earth's surface (effectively multiplying a rider's weight by 2.5). A few months after the ride's opening, motion sickness bags were added within easy reach of riders.

Tributes to Horizons
Horizons was the attraction that Mission: Space replaced. Keeping in line with a Disney tradition of paying tribute to defunct attractions in new attractions, Mission: Space features several subtle tributes to Horizons.

The Horizons logo is on display at the center of the rotating "gravity wheel" in the queue.
During the pre-show, the Horizons logo can be found on the bottom right hand corner of some of the screens in the video, along with the text "Brava Centauri", the space themed location featured in Horizons.
 With the 2017 refurbishment, the Brava Centauri station can be seen orbiting Earth in a new mural at the entrance of the attraction.
The Horizons logo can also be seen during the safety briefing outside the capsule
The Horizons logo can also be found on the front of the cash register counter in the gift shop on the way out of the attraction.
The planter at the front of the building formerly contained the Horizons marquee. The planter was not removed or significantly altered during Mission: Space's construction.
There is also a tribute to the Magic Kingdom's Mission to Mars and Flight to the Moon attractions. In the mission control room in the queue, the footage of the bird landing was reused from the pre-show of said attractions.

Incidents

The minimum height requirement for the Mars Mission (Orange Mission) is 44 inches, while for the Earth Mission (Green Mission) is 40 inches. Spiels and warnings throughout the attraction caution that people who do not like enclosed dark spaces, simulators, spinning, or are prone to motion sickness should not ride. Signs also warn that the ride may cause nausea, headache, dizziness, or disorientation, and that people prone to motion sickness, or who have a headache or an inner ear problem, or who have a history of migraines, vertigo, or elevated anxiety also should not ride. These signs are similar to those present at considerably less-intense rides in the same park, such as Soarin'. There are also signs which instruct the rider to keep their head flat against the headrest, stating that if one ignores this, the centrifugal motion acting on one's head can cause undesirable effects such as dizziness and/or headaches, or possibly even more serious effects.

Several people have been taken to local hospitals for chest pain and nausea after riding. Most who complained of these symptoms were over 55 years old. Two people have died after experiencing the attraction, although due to pre-existing conditions: one, a 4-year-old boy, with an undiagnosed heart condition, and the other, a 49-year-old woman, from a stroke due to high blood pressure.

References

External links
 Walt Disney World Resort – Mission: Space
 Walt Disney World Resort – Mission: Space Advanced Training Lab

Amusement rides introduced in 2003
Walt Disney Parks and Resorts attractions
Epcot
Walt Disney Parks and Resorts films
Simulator rides
Future World (Epcot)
World Discovery
Outer space in amusement parks
Films set in the future
Centrifuges
2003 establishments in Florida